Howard Homestead is a historic home located at Duanesburg in Schenectady County, New York. It was built in the 1820s or early 1830s and is a one-story, clapboard sided rectangular frame residence on a partially exposed concrete basement.  It is in a late Federal / early Greek Revival style. It has a gable roof with returns and a three bay, side hall configuration.

The property was covered in a 1984 study of Duanesburg historical resources.
It was listed on the National Register of Historic Places in 1984.

References

Houses on the National Register of Historic Places in New York (state)
Houses in Schenectady County, New York
Federal architecture in New York (state)
Greek Revival houses in New York (state)
National Register of Historic Places in Schenectady County, New York